The 2017–18 season was Genoa Cricket and Football Club's eleventh consecutive season in Serie A. Having finished 16th the previous season, the club managed to improve on its league position, finishing 12th in Serie A, while they were eliminated in the Coppa Italia by eventual champions Juventus.

Players

Squad information

Transfers

In

Loans in

Out

Loans out

Pre-season and friendlies

Competitions

Serie A

League table

Results summary

Results by round

Matches

Coppa Italia

Statistics

Appearances and goals

|-
! colspan=14 style=background:#dcdcdc; text-align:center| Goalkeepers

|-
! colspan=14 style=background:#dcdcdc; text-align:center| Defenders

|-
! colspan=14 style=background:#dcdcdc; text-align:center| Midfielders

|-
! colspan=14 style=background:#dcdcdc; text-align:center| Forwards

|-
! colspan=14 style=background:#dcdcdc; text-align:center| Players transferred out during the season

Goalscorers

Last updated: 20 May 2018

Clean sheets

Last updated: 20 May 2018

Disciplinary record

Last updated: 20 May 2018

References

Genoa C.F.C. seasons
Genoa